Day Star First Nation ( kîsikâwacâhk) is a First Nations band government in Saskatchewan, Canada. Their reserves include:

 Day Star 87
 Last Mountain Lake 80A
 Treaty Four Reserve Grounds 77, shared with 32 other bands.

References

First Nations in Saskatchewan